Louis I of Zweibrücken (1424 – 19 July 1489) was Count Palatine and Duke of Zweibrücken and Count of Veldenz from 1444 until his death in 1489.

Life 
He was the younger son of Stephen, Count Palatine of Simmern-Zweibrücken and his wife Anna, heiress of the County of Veldenz, whom he had wed in 1409. Although Anne died in 1439, her widower did not obtain Veldenz from her family until 1444. In that year, Stephen decided how his territories would be divided upon his death, allocating Simmern to his elder son, Frederick and Zweibrucken to his younger son Louis, combining with it Veldenz and most of the County of Sponheim.

Family and children
He was married on 20 March 1454 in Luxemburg to Johanna of Croÿ, daughter of Count Antoine I de Croÿ and Margaret of Lorraine-Vaudémont. They had the following children:
 Margarete (1456–1527), married in 1470 to Count Philip of Nassau-Idstein.
 Kaspar (1458–1527).
 Johanna (1459–1520), a nun at Marienberg near Boppard
 Anna (1461–1520), a nun at Marienberg near Boppard.
 Alexander (1462–1514).
 David (1463–1478).
 Albrecht (1464–1513), a canon in Strassburg and Köln.
 Katharina (1465–1542), Abbess of St. Agnes, Trier.
 Philipp (1467–1489), a canon in Strassburg.
 Johann (1468–1513), a canon in Strassburg and Köln.
 Elisabeth (1469–1500), married in 1492 to Count John Louis of Nassau-Saarbrücken.
 Samson (1474–1480)

Ancestors

References

1424 births
1489 deaths
House of Palatinate-Zweibrücken
Counts Palatine of Zweibrücken